Vossler is a surname. Notable people with the surname include:

Ernie Vossler (1928–2013), American golfer
Karl Vossler (1872–1949), German linguist and scholar